Anouar El Azzouzi (born 29 May 2001) is a professional footballer who plays as a centre-back for Dordrecht. Born in the Netherlands, he is a youth international for Morocco.

Professional career
El Azzouzi is a youth product of his local club VRC Veenendaal and Vitesse. He began his senior career with the reserves of Vitesse in 2018. He spent the 2019-20 season with the reserves of NAC Breda, but left after a disagreement with the technical leadership in December 2020. On 2 August 2021, El Azzouzi transferred to Dordrecht where he was initially assigned to the reserves. On 2 February 2022, he signed a professional contract with the club.

International career
Born in the Netherlands, El Azzouzi is of Moroccan descent. He was called up to a training camp for the Netherlands U18s in 2018. He is a youth international for Morocco, having played for the Morocco U20s in 2020.

Personal life
El Azzouzi is the twin brother of the footballer Oussama El Azzouzi.

References

External links
 

2001 births
Living people
People from Veenendaal
Moroccan footballers
Morocco youth international footballers
Dutch footballers
Dutch sportspeople of Moroccan descent
Association football defenders
SBV Vitesse players
NAC Breda players
FC Dordrecht players
Eerste Divisie players
Tweede Divisie players
Twin sportspeople